Wellington County is a county in New South Wales, Australia, which was one of the original Nineteen Counties. The town of Wellington is near the north-eastern edge. The Bell River is the boundary to the west, and the Cudgegong River to the north. It includes land on both sides of the Macquarie River.

It contains the town of Mudgee, where the first house was stated to have been built in 1837 by John Blackman.

There is a modern-day local government area called just "Wellington Council".

Wellington County was named in honour of Arthur Wellesley, Duke of Wellington (1769-1852).

Parishes within this county
A full list of parishes found within this county; their current LGA and mapping coordinates to the approximate centre of each location is as follows:

References

Counties of New South Wales